Saint-Clar is a commune in the Gers department in southwestern France.

Geography
The river Arrats forms most of the commune's eastern border; the Auroue flows north through the western part of the commune.

History
Saint-Clar was founded in 1289 by Edward I, King of England and Duke of Aquitaine.

Structure
Its grid layout follows the standards of the typical Bastides grid. The basic architectural element is the central square boarded by arcades and stone and half-timbered houses. This square was the market place and the center of the communities’ economy. The market hall (market building) in the central square was built with stone and with wooden pillars. Now it hosts the Town Hall (Place de la Mairie), which has a beautiful steeple with clock. This Town Hall was better known as “maison commune”. Apart from that central square, Saint-Clar has one more arcaded square, both just a few steps away from each other.  This is located in the south, in the original village, in the “castet bielh” (old quarter).

Population

See also

Communes of the Gers department

References

Communes of Gers
Gers communes articles needing translation from French Wikipedia